Vefsn is a municipality in Nordland county, Norway. It is part of the Helgeland traditional region. The administrative centre of the municipality is the town of Mosjøen (population: 9,843). Some of the notable villages in Vefsn include Drevvassbygda, Elsfjord, and Husvik.

The  municipality is the 41st largest by area out of the 356 municipalities in Norway. Vefsn is the 92nd most populous municipality in Norway with a population of 13,233.

History

The municipality of Vefsn was established on 1 January 1838 (see formannskapsdistrikt law). In 1862, the vast eastern district of Vefsn (population: 921) was separated from Vefsn to become the new municipality of Hattfjelldal. This left Vefsn with 5,051 residents. In 1876, the town of Mosjøen (population: 379) was separated from Vefsn to become a separate municipality. This left Vefsn with 4,672 residents.

In 1927, Vefsn municipality was split into three: the small northern district (population: 964) became the new municipality of Drevja and the large southern district (population: 1,746) became the new municipality of Grane. After the split, Vefsn had 3,119 residents remaining. In 1939, a small area of Vefsn (population: 45) was transferred to neighboring town of Mosjøen.

During the 1960s, there were many municipal mergers across Norway due to the work of the Schei Committee. On 1 January 1962, the municipality of Vefsn (population: 5,358) was merged with the neighboring town of Mosjøen (population: 4,628) and the neighboring municipalities of Drevja (population: 1,001) and Elsfjord (population: 920) to form a new, larger municipality of Vefsn. On 1 January 1995, the mainland areas of the neighboring Alstahaug Municipality (population: 70) were transferred to Vefsn.

Name

The municipality (originally the parish) is named after the river Vefsna which flows through the municipality into the Vefsnfjorden. The meaning of the river name is unknown, but it possibly comes from the old word  which means "to wrap" or "to wind around". Historically, the spelling has varied from Vefsen to Væffsn.

Coat of arms
The coat of arms was granted on 13 September 1974. The official blazon is "Sable, a rooster argent armed gules". This means the arms have a black field (background) and the charge is a rooster. The rooster has a tincture of argent which means it is commonly colored white, but if it is made out of metal, then silver is used. The rooster is also armed which means its claws, beak, and comb are colored red. The rooster is a symbol for watchfulness and alertness. The arms were designed by Arthur Gustavsson.

The coat of arms was originally adopted by the municipality of Mosjøen on 25 March 1960. In 1962, Mosjøen was merged with Vefsn, Drevja, and Elsfjord to form a new, larger Vefsn municipality. After the merger, the old arms of Mosjøen were chosen for the new municipality. Since the arms officially became obsolete after the merger, they were re-granted in 1974.

Churches
The Church of Norway has three parishes within the municipality of Vefsn. It is part of the Indre Helgeland prosti (deanery) in the Diocese of Sør-Hålogaland.

Geography
The administrative centre of Vefsn is the town of Mosjøen which is situated along the innermost part of the Vefsnfjorden. Outside Mosjøen, the large municipality of Vefsn is dominated by spruce forests, mountains, lakes, agriculture, and the Vefsna river. The municipality is served by Mosjøen Airport, Kjærstad.

The mountain Lukttinden is located in the northern part of the municipality. There are many large lakes in Vefsn including Drevvatnet, Finnknevatnet, Fustvatnet, Hundålvatnet, Luktvatnet, Mjåvatnet, and Ømmervatnet. The Lomsdal–Visten National Park is partially located in Vefsn.

Birdlife
The bird watcher that visits Vefsn soon realizes that it will take more than a day to cover all the interesting habitats and birding areas. Here you will find areas of virtually untouched coniferous woodlands, both inland and along the coast. The Skjørlegda nature reserve is a good example of woodland protection. Here you will find a virtually untouched coniferous forest covering the Eiterå valley. The valley stretches inland to a higher mountainous habitat that is also worth checking.

Government
All municipalities in Norway, including Vefsn, are responsible for primary education (through 10th grade), outpatient health services, senior citizen services, unemployment and other social services, zoning, economic development, and municipal roads. The municipality is governed by a municipal council of elected representatives, which in turn elect a mayor.  The municipality falls under the Alstahaug District Court and the Hålogaland Court of Appeal.

Municipal council
The municipal council of Vefsn is made up of 29 representatives that are elected to four year terms. The party breakdown of the council is as follows:

Mayors
The mayors of Vefsn:

 1838–1842: Christian Quale 
 1842–1844: Kristoffer Ingebrigtsen
 1844–1862: Ola Olsson
 1863–1864: Peter Holst 
 1865–1866: Ola Olsson 
 1867–1870: Anders Persson
 1871–1876: John Ottesen 
 1877–1878: Even Sund 
 1889–1894: Peter Holst 
 1895–1896: Nils M. Kulstad 
 1897–1898: Even Sund 
 1899–1901: Per Flaa (LL)
 1902–1904: Nils Kulstad (V)
 1905-1905: Christian Møinichen Havig (V)
 1905-1905: Per Flaa (LL)
 1905–1913: Ole Klemmentsen (V)
 1914–1916: Mikkel Alsgaard (V)
 1917–1918: Nils Skandfer 
 1919-1920: Sølfest Hagen
 1920–1925: Nils Mjaavatn
 1926–1928: Anders Svare (V)
 1929–1940: Per M. Stordal (Ap)
 1943–1945: Anders Svare
 1946-1946: Kåre Vangen 			 
 1946–1947: Arne Aalbotsjord (Ap)
 1948–1954: Anders Granås 			 
 1954–1955: Arne Aalbotsjord (Ap)
 1956-1959: Kåre Vangen
 1960-1961: Arne Aalbotsjord (Ap)
 1962-1966: Einar Jensen (Ap)
 1966–1975: Arne Aalbotsjord (Ap)
 1976–1979: Eugen Almås (Ap)
 1980-1989: Peder Hyttebakk (Ap)
 1990-1993: Roy Skogsholm (Ap)
 1993-1998: Knut Petter Torgersen (Ap)
 1998-2000: Britt Jonassen (Ap)
 2000-2019: Jann-Arne Løvdahl (Ap)
 2019–present: Berit Hundåla (Sp)

Notable people
Notable people that were born or lived in Vefsn include:

 Thorolf Holmboe (1866 in Vefsn –1935), a painter, illustrator and designer
 Nils Mjaavatn (1883 in Vefsn – 1951), a farmer, teacher and politician
 David Monrad Johansen (1888 in Vefsn – 1974), a composer
 Aage Grundstad (1923 in Vefsn – 2012), an award-winning accordion player 
 Erling Bauck (1924 in Mosjøen – 2004), a Norwegian resistance member and writer.
 Kjell Eliassen (born 1929 in Vefsn), a diplomat
 Trond Øyen (1929 in Mosjøen – 1999), a Norwegian violinist
 Baard Owe (1936 in Mosjøen – 2017), an actor, moved to Denmark in 1956 
 Inga Juuso (1945 in Mosjøen – 2014), a yoiker, Sami singer and actress 
 Odd Eriksen (born 1955; worked in Mosjøen), a politician also known for stopping an Algerian hijacker from crashing a Kato Air-flight in 2004.
 Frode Fjellheim (born 1959 in Mussere), a yoiker and musician on piano and synthesizer
 Finn Guttormsen (born 1968 in Mosjøen), a Jazz musician on upright bass
 Aleksander L. Nordaas (born 1982 in Mosjøen), a screenwriter and film director  
 Silje Reinåmo (born 1982 in Mosjøen), an actress, dancer and musical performer 
 Sandra Lyng (born 1987 in Mosjøen), a Norwegian singer

Sport 
 Johan Lind (born 1942 in Mosjøen), a speed skater, competed at the 1968 and 1972 Winter Olympics
 Bent Inge Johnsen (born 1972 in Mosjøen), a former footballer with 284 club caps and assistant manager
 Anette Sagen (born 1985 in Mosjøen), a Norwegian former ski jumper
 Thomas Drage (born 1992 in Mosjøen), a football player with over 220 club caps

See also
Nazi concentration camps in Norway

References

External links

Municipal fact sheet from Statistics Norway 
mosjoen.com - local portal for Mosjøen and Vefsn (in Norwegian)
Local history and genealogy 
Andås nature reserve with mixed forest  
Skjørlægda nature reserve preserving an intact valley ecosystem 

 
Municipalities of Nordland
1838 establishments in Norway